Ottapparai is a census town in Erode district in the Indian state of Tamil Nadu.

Demographics
 India census, Ottapparai had a population of 9216. Males constitute 69% of the population and females 31%. Ottapparai has an average literacy rate of 61%, higher than the national average of 59.5%: male literacy is 71%, and female literacy is 50%. In Ottapparai, 11% of the population is under 6 years of age.

References

Villages in Erode district